Peter Nydrle (November 16, 1954 – July 5, 2014) was an award-winning commercial and music video director, producer, and director of photography. He directed various commercial spots and ran his company, Nydrle, Inc.  in West Hollywood, California.

On July 4, 2011, his film Eugene Among Us had a renewed premiere at the Karlovy Vary International Film Festival to commemorate the 30th Anniversary of the film being banned by the totalitarian regime at the time in the former Czechoslovakia.

In May, 1993, he directed a full length concert video for Carlos Santana - "Sacred Fire." Produced by Paul Flattery and exec-produced by Jeannie Mattiussi, it was shot over two nights in Mexico City and released on DVD November 2, 1993.

Tracks 
 Angels All Around Us (Introduction)
 Viva la Vida (Life Is For Living)
 Esperando
 No One to Depend On
 Black Magic Woman/Gypsy Queen
 Oye Como Va
 Samba Pa Ti
 Guajira
 Make Somebody Happy
 Toussaint l'Overture
 Soul Sacrifice/Don't Try This at Home
 Europa (Earth's Cry Heaven's Smile)
 Jin-Go-Lo-Ba

Santana lineup 
 Jorge Santana: guitar
 Walfredo Reyes: percussion, drums
 Myron Dove: bass, background vocals
 Alex Ligertwood: vocals, background vocals
 Karl Perazzo: conga, timbales, vocals, background vocals
 Raul Rekow: percussion, conga, background vocals
 Chester Thompson: keyboards, background vocals
 Carlos Santana: guitar, percussion, vocals, background vocals
 Vorriece Cooper: vocals, background vocals

Awards 
Gold Lion Awards: Cannes International Advertising Festival - 1997 for Harley Davidson "Birds", 2009 Cannes Advertising Festival - Chambers Hotel "Video Art Piece"

References

External links 

 Official website of Nydrle, Inc.
 Peter Nydrle at mvdbase.com

Czechoslovak emigrants to the United States
1954 births
2014 deaths
Advertising directors